The 1943 Segunda División Peruana, the second division of Peruvian football (soccer), was played by 4 teams. The tournament winner, Telmo Carbajo was promoted to the Promotional Playoff. Jorge Chávez was promoted to the 1944 Segunda División Peruana.

Results

Standings

Promotion playoff

External links
 La Historia de la Segunda: El primer campeonato

 

Peruvian Segunda División seasons
Peru2
2